John Sumner may refer to:

Entertainment
 John Sumner (actor, born 1951), English actor
 John Sumner (actor, died 1649) (died 1649), English theatre actor during the Caroline era
 J. D. Sumner (1924–1998), American gospel singer and songwriter
 John Sumner (director) (1924–2013), English-born Australian artistic director and founder of Melbourne Theatre Company

Religion
 John Sumner (priest) (died 1772), Canon of Windsor and Headmaster of Eton College
 John Bird Sumner (1780–1862), bishop in the Church of England and Archbishop of Canterbury

Other
 John Robert Sumner (1850–1933), amateur footballer and 1873 FA Cup finalist
 John Sumner (tea merchant) (1856–1934)
 John S. Sumner (1876–1971), headed the New York Society for the Suppression of Vice
 John Sumner (climber) (1936–2004), British climber

See also
 Jack Sumner (1840–1907), American explorer